Gol Airport, Klanten is an airport which lies on Golsfjellet north of Gol town centre in Gol municipality in Viken county, Norway.

References

External links
  Klanten Flying Club

Airports in Viken
Gol, Norway